Dirty Money: The Story of the Criminal Assets Bureau was an Irish crime program broadcast on TV3 at 10pm on Monday nights. The show began on 25 February and ended on 3 April 2008. The series comprised six one-hour episodes examining the role of the Criminal Assets Bureau (CAB). The program was presented and narrated by the then Sunday World journalist Paul Williams. Williams explores what led to the establishment of the multi-agency Bureau and interviews the people who played a big part in the formation of the bureau.

The series was released on DVD in the run up to Christmas 2008. The programme began a repeat broadcast on 6 January 2009, ending on 9 February 2009.

Episodes
Twelve episode s were made:
 State of Fear - Establishment of the Bureau, including the murder of Veronica Guerin
 The CAB operation against John Gilligan, his assets and his gang
 Starting Days of CAB and more on Veronica GuerinThe CAB operation against tax-dodger Ray Burke
 Operation Alpha, the CAB operation against bank robber Gerry Hutch Big Guns, seizing the assets of the IRA
 Cleared for Payoff Spring into Action 
 Coffin Up Big Bucks New York State of Find Life in the Cash Lane Brite Ideas''

References

2008 Irish television series endings
2008 Irish television series debuts
Documentary television series about policing
Irish crime television series
Irish documentary television series
Virgin Media Television (Ireland) original programming